The 1986 Big East men's basketball tournament took place at Madison Square Garden in New York City, from March 5 to March 8, 1986. Its winner received the Big East Conference's automatic bid to the 1986 NCAA tournament. It is a single-elimination tournament with four rounds.  St. John's had the best regular season conference record and received the #1 seed.

St. John's defeated Syracuse in the championship game 70–69, to claim its second Big East tournament championship.

Bracket

Awards
Most Valuable Player: Dwayne Washington, Syracuse

All Tournament Team
 Walter Berry, St. John's
 Mark Jackson, St. John's
 Harold Pressley, Villanova
 Rony Seikaly, Syracuse
 Dwayne Washington, Syracuse
 Reggie Williams, Georgetown

External links

References

Tournament
Big East men's basketball tournament
Basketball in New York City
College sports in New York City
Sports competitions in New York City
Sports in Manhattan
Big East men's basketball tournament
Big East men's basketball tournament
1980s in Manhattan
Madison Square Garden